Silje Nes (born November 25, 1980 in Leikanger) is a Norwegian multi-instrumentalist, singer and sound artist. She has released two albums on British label Fat Cat Records. She released her first album, Ames Room, in December 2007. Nes' second album, Opticks, was released on September 12, 2010. As a sound artist she creates sound installations that take form as environments developing over time.

Nes has a background as a classical pianist. On her albums she plays all instruments, arranges, and produces.

External links 
 Silje Nes' official website
 Silje Nes' label Noko Ana
 FatCat Records website
 Silje gjør det selv ("Silje does it herself") Aftenposten, January 8, 2008.
 Silje Nes bio, Allmusic.com

1980 births
Living people
Norwegian multi-instrumentalists
Norwegian musicians
21st-century Norwegian singers
21st-century Norwegian women singers
FatCat Records artists
People from Leikanger
Women sound artists